Quitemoca (Quitemo) was a Chapacuran language.

References

Chapacuran languages